Rieju is a Spanish-French manufacturer of mopeds and motorcycles from Spain. It is based in Figueres. They specialise in small-displacement motorcycles (between 49 and 450cc) using Minarelli engines. Their products are available in almost all European countries.

History

In 1934, two young entrepreneurs, Luis Riera Carré and Jaime Juanola Farrés, founded a company to manufacture bicycle accessories. The name RIEJU came from the first letters of each of their surnames (RIEra + JUanola).

They bought some land and started to build a factory, but the Spanish Civil War thwarted their plans. The Republican Government confiscated the unfinished building and used it as a truck depot. A second storey was built above the existing premises during the war and was considered a payment of interests when the facilities were returned.

In 1940, once the war was over, Rieju resumed its industrial activity making bicycle accessories.

In 1942, Rieju was established as a Private Limited Company (Sociedad Limitada) with a capital of 1 million pesetas, and started to build, alongside components, their first bicycle models. The company now had 35 employees and an average of 30 bicycles were built each week.

In 1947 Rieju built their first moped, adding to one of their bicycles an auxiliary 38 cc four-stroke engine (built by Serwa of France) coupled to the rear wheel. This model had a power of 1 HP and a maximum speed of around 40 km/h. Two years later, in 1949, Rieju launched the "No. 2" model, now with a more powerful engine and a gearbox designed in-house. Later models (No.3, No.4, etc.) evolved the vehicle to give it a "motorcycle look".

In 1964 Rieju reached an agreement with Minarelli to manufacture their engines under licence, and launched the "Jaca" model, with 3.5 HP and a top speed of 70 km/h, but this was limited to 40 km/h due to moped regulations.

The landmark Jaca model was evolved throughout the 1960s and 70s, giving birth to the Confort and TT models. In 1978, Rieju developed a moped with automatic transmission but it was not successful.

Production kept increasing steadily throughout the 80s, with new and more varied models, placing Rieju among the top moped sellers in Spain. Also, Rieju bikes won several prizes in international Enduro competitions, raising the profile of the marque.

In 1994,the company opened itself to other markets and started exporting their models across Europe. By 2006 exports represented about 60% of their sales.

2011 saw the launch of many new Rieju machines, most notably the new RS3 50 and RS3 125LC. They are made in Spain and are powered by Yamaha engines.

In 2020 Rieju purchased the rights to GasGas's off-road motorcycle models.

In 2021, Rieju launched there first electric two moped the "Nuuk CargoPro", a 6KW electric delivery scooter with a 100-120 kilometre range with a top speed of 90km/h.

In 2022, Rieju launched there second electric scooter, the "E-City" designed for urban driving. The scooter was released with two variations, a  50cc equivalent which comes with a top speed of 45 km/h with a range of up to 70 kilometres, and a 125cc  variation with a top speed of  75 km/h and a range of 160 kilometres.

Competitions 
The first victory of Rieju in Endurance was in the 1979/1980 season, when Jordi Piferrer Taulé, riding a Marathon machine, won the 80cc category of the Spanish Championship.

References

External links

 The official English site
 Rieju club Holland; a forum for technical questions, also in English under topic; international forum
 RIEJU MOTORS models & history

Companies based in Catalonia
Vehicle manufacturing companies established in 1934
Motorcycle manufacturers of Spain
Moped manufacturers
Spanish brands
Spanish companies established in 1934
Figueres